The 2020–21 Chicago State Cougars men's basketball team represented Chicago State University in the 2020–21 NCAA Division I men's basketball season. The Cougars were led by third-year head coach Lance Irvin. They played their home games at the Emil and Patricia Jones Convocation Center as members of the Western Athletic Conference. They finished the season 0–9, 0–0 in WAC play before suspending the season due to COVID-19 and an insufficient number of players.

Previous season

The 2019–20 Cougars finished the 2019–20 season 4–25, 0–14 in WAC play to finish in last place. They were set to be the eighth overall seed in the WAC tournament, but the tournament was cancelled due to the COVID-19 pandemic.

Offseason

Departures

Transfers 
 Levelle Ziegler - East LA College
 Isaiah Simpson - Santa Monica College
 Aaris-Monte Bonds - Southeastern CC
 Coreyoun Rushin - Idaho State
 Jordan Polynice - East LA College

2020 recruiting class

Preseason

WAC media poll 
The WAC men's basketball media poll was released on October 27, 2020. Chicago State was picked to finish ninth.

Roster

Schedule 

|-
!colspan=9 style=| Non-conference regular season

|-
!colspan=9 style=| WAC regular season
|-

|-

Source

Rankings

*AP does not release post-NCAA Tournament rankings

References

Chicago State Cougars men's basketball seasons
Chicago State
Chicago State
Chicago State
Chicago State